Kim Astrup Sørensen (born 6 March 1992) is a Danish badminton player. As junior player, he won the bronze medal at the 2010 World Junior Championships in the boys' doubles. He later won a gold in the mixed doubles and bronze medals in the boys' doubles and team events at the 2011 European Junior Championships. He joined the Denmark winning team at the 2016 Thomas Cup in Kunshan, China, where he and his teammates beating Indonesia 3–2 in the final. Astrup emerged victorious in the men's doubles at the 2018 European Championships.

Career 
In 2016, Astrup joined the Denmark winning team at the 2016 Thomas Cup in Kunshan, China, where he and his teammates beating Indonesia 3–2 in the final.

In 2018, Astrup emerge victorious in the men's doubles at the European Championships. In the final, Astrup and Anders Skaarup Rasmussen received an easy win to their compatriot Mads Conrad-Petersen and Mads Pieler Kolding, after Kolding had to withdraw due to abdominal injury before going into the second game.

Astrup competed at the 2019 European Games, and won the silver medal in the men's doubles with Anders Skaarup Rasmussen.

Astrup competed at the 2020 Summer Olympics in the men's doubles partnering Anders Skaarup Rasmussen. The duo were eliminated in the quarter-finals to Li Junhui and Liu Yuchen.

At the 2021 World Championships, Astrup and Rasmussen were defeated in the semi-finals by the Chinese pair He Jiting and Tan Qiang, and the duo settled for the bronze medal at the Championships.

Achievements

BWF World Championships 
Men's doubles

European Games 
Men's doubles

European Championships 
Men's doubles

BWF World Junior Championships 
Boys' doubles

European Junior Championships 
Boys' doubles

Mixed doubles

BWF World Tour (3 titles, 3 runners-up) 
The BWF World Tour, which was announced on 19 March 2017 and implemented in 2018, is a series of elite badminton tournaments sanctioned by the Badminton World Federation (BWF). The BWF World Tour is divided into levels of World Tour Finals, Super 1000, Super 750, Super 500, Super 300, and the BWF Tour Super 100.

Men's doubles

BWF Grand Prix (3 titles, 3 runners-up) 
The BWF Grand Prix had two levels, the Grand Prix and Grand Prix Gold. It was a series of badminton tournaments sanctioned by the Badminton World Federation (BWF) and played between 2007 and 2017.

Men's doubles

  BWF Grand Prix Gold tournament
  BWF Grand Prix tournament

BWF International Challenge/Series (7 titles, 7 runners-up) 
Men's doubles

Mixed doubles

  BWF International Challenge tournament
  BWF International Series tournament

Record against selected opponents 
Men's doubles results with Anders Skaarup Rasmussen against Year-end Finals finalists, World Championships semifinalists, and Olympic quarterfinalists. Accurate as of 11 December 2022.

References

External links 
 

1992 births
Living people
People from Herning Municipality
Sportspeople from the Central Denmark Region
Danish male badminton players
Badminton players at the 2020 Summer Olympics
Olympic badminton players of Denmark
Badminton players at the 2019 European Games
European Games silver medalists for Denmark
European Games medalists in badminton
21st-century Danish people